Chiocchetti is a surname. Notable people with the surname include:

 Arcangelo Chiocchetti (1921–2001), Italian cross-country skier
 Renzo Chiocchetti (1945–2020), Italian cross-country skier

Italian-language surnames
Surnames of South Tyrolean origin